Anton Matveyenko may refer to:
 Anton Matveyenko (footballer, born 1986), Belarusian footballer
 Anton Matveyenko (footballer, born 1989), Belarusian footballer